Umrain is a town in Auraiya district in the state of Uttar Pradesh, India. Umrain is one of the sub-divisional towns of Auraiya District. This township is situated to the north west of Auraiya, the district headquarters 65 km, and 21 km away from Bidhuna, another major town in the district. Airwa-Katra, Bidhuna, Harnagarpur and Usrahaar are its neighboring towns. Umrain is linked directly to Kishni and Bidhuna Road.  The literacy is about 80%. In Umrain there are two famous temple Durga Mandir and Dwarikadheesh Mandir.

Demographics 
Umrain had a population of 10,172. Males constitute 54% of the population and females 46%. Umrain has an average literacy rate of 80%, higher than the national average of 59.5%: male literacy is 88%, and female literacy is 68%. In Umrain, 12% of the population is under 6 years of age. At Umrain there is an ancient Shiv Temple named (Van Khandeshwar Mahadev) situated on Mishrabad road.

Language and script

The language of practically the entire population is what is known as western Hindi. The returns of the census 1981 showed that this language was spoken by about 96.8 per cent of the population. In 1971, the percentage of Hindi speaking persons was 96.4. Western Hindi is split up into several subdivisions. In 1981, the language known as Hindustani or Urdu was spoken by about 3.10 per cent (3.35 per cent in 1961) of the people, representing for the most part the inhabitants of Umrain.

Religion and caste
Hindu
The major community was originally divided into four branches, Brahmana, Kshatriya, Vaishya and Sudra. This ancient division was mainly occupational but gradually developed into a hereditary order. Now in modern society, due to the impact of progressive social and economic forces, the old cast structure is crumbling though somewhat slowly. It has already lost its rigidity. There are several social  groups like Kayasths, Gujars etc. present for this community

Scheduled Caste/Harijans
In Umrain 10% of the population are scheduled caste/harijans. There are minimum ratio of yadav (Ahirs), Prajapati(Kumhar). There are 30% Brahmans such as Dubey, Mishra, Tripathi, Shukla, Chaturvedi, Pathak etc. Some 5% of the population are Chauhan/Sengars. Muslims make up 15% of the population. About 23% of the population are Guptas. Some 17% of the population are Shakyas.

Geography 

Umrain is located at 26° 43' 0N 79° 25' 0E. It has an average elevation of 136 meters (448 feet).

Cities and towns in Auraiya district